Gamvik is a fishing village in Gamvik Municipality in Troms og Finnmark county, Norway. The village is located on the northern shore of the Nordkinn Peninsula, along the Barents Sea. Gamvik is home to the Gamvik Museum and Gamvik Church. The village is an old church site with churches located here since at least the 1850s.

The village was historically only accessible by boat, but due to the poor harbor conditions, the daily Hurtigruten steamers had to drop anchor a little way out from the shore and then smaller boats had to ferry people into the village.  In the 1970s, Gamvik Airport was built and in the 1980s, Norwegian County Road 888 was built from Lebesby to Gamvik.

While Grense Jakobselv is the settlement farthest away from the capital Oslo, if international routes (through Sweden and Finland) are included, Gamvik is the place in Norway with longest road distance from Oslo: .

Slettnes nature reserve is also located north of the village and it is an important breeding ground for a large number of bird species, and it is home to the second largest colony of parasitic jaegers. The remains of the old Gamvik Airport as well as some ruins of World War II fortifications are found to the north of the village.

History
In June 1972 construction started for a land-side terminal and running a SOSUS cable into the sea. The SOSUS station was one of more than twenty worldwide.

Media gallery

Climate
The Gamvik area has a maritime tundra climate (ET) that borders on being a subarctic climate (Dfc). This renders long, but moderated winters from the Gulf Stream waters, that renders overnight lows to average around the freezing point over a full year. In summers, brief heat bursts can reach the location through southerly winds. Mostly, temps remain chilly even during the long period of midnight sun. Gamvik experiences a long polar night window as well due to its latitude at above 71°N.

References

External links

Gamvik museum

Villages in Finnmark
Gamvik
Populated places of Arctic Norway